Silvijo Petriško (born 20 November 1979 in Zagreb) is a Croatian rower, who won a bronze medal in the eights competition at the 2000 Summer Olympics in Sydney. He was the coxswain of the team, compromising Igor Francetić, Igor Boraska, Nikša Skelin, Siniša Skelin, Branimir Vujević, Krešimir Čuljak, Tomislav Smoljanović, and Tihomir Franković.

External links
Short profile on Hrvatska Sport

1979 births
Living people
Croatian male rowers
Rowers at the 2000 Summer Olympics
Coxswains (rowing)
Olympic rowers of Croatia
Olympic bronze medalists for Croatia
Olympic medalists in rowing

Medalists at the 2000 Summer Olympics